Romiplostim, sold under the brand name Nplate among others, is a fusion protein analog of thrombopoietin, a hormone that regulates platelet production.

Indications and Marketing
The drug was developed by Amgen through a restricted usage program called NEXUS.  During development and clinical trials the drug was called AMG531.

Romiplostim is indicated as a potential treatment for chronic idiopathic (immune) thrombocytopenic purpura (ITP).   Romiplostim was designated an orphan drug by the U.S. Food and Drug Administration (FDA) in 2003, as the chronic ITP population in the USA is under 200,000 (the chronic adult ITP population in the USA is thought to be around 60,000, with women outnumbering men by a factor of two). The wholesale cost of romiplostim if administered weekly is currently estimated at US$55,250 per year.

On August 22, 2008, the FDA approved romiplostim as a long-term treatment for chronic ITP in adults who have not responded to other treatments, such as corticosteroids, intravenous immunoglobulin, Rho(D) immune globulin or splenectomy.

Treatment regimen
Romiplostim treatment is generally administered at weekly intervals via subcutaneous injection.  Prior to injection, a complete blood count (CBC) is obtained, as the dosage is dependent on the individual's body weight and platelet count at the time of treatment.  The goal of treatment is to maintain the count above 50,000 per cubic millimeter (mm3) of blood, not to achieve a normal count—defined as 150,000–450,000 per mm3 in most healthy individuals.  If a count of 200,000 or higher is achieved for two consecutive weeks a reduced dose is administered or treatment is suspended until the count decreases below 200,000. Discontinuation of romiplostim is usually done by tapered dose, as abruptly stopping treatment can lead to rebound thrombocytopenia.

Clinical efficacy
In well designed, 24-week, Phase III trials, romiplostim was significantly more effective than placebo in achieving the primary endpoint of a protocol-defined durable platelet response in nonsplenectomized or splenectomized adults with chronic immune thrombocytopenic purpura.

Side-effects
Romiplostim's effect is to stimulate the patient's megakaryocytes to produce platelets at a more rapid than normal rate, thus overwhelming the immune system's ability to destroy them. As doing so involves changes to the bone marrow chemistry, a number of potentially serious side-effects may develop, including death, myalgia, joint and extremity discomfort, insomnia, thrombocytosis, which may lead to potentially fatal clots, and bone marrow fibrosis, the latter of which may result in an unsafe decrease in the red blood count.

Experimental treatment of acute radiation syndrome
Romiplostim may be used to treat acute radiation syndrome. "To reduce radiation-induced bleeding, Nplate stimulates the body’s production of platelets. The drug can be used to treat adults and children."

References

External links
 

Antihemorrhagics
Orphan drugs
Thrombopoietin receptor agonists